FK Sloga Jugomagnat was a football club that played in Skopje, North Macedonia.

History

FC Victory(Победа) era (1927–1945)

The club was established in 1927 under the name FK Zafer (Победа which means 'Victory' in Macedonian)  by the football enthusiasts coming from Skopje’s neighborhood Čair - Meadow. Like other clubs from Skopje at that time, Zafer also played friendly matches with other clubs from the city.

Shortly after, Zafer begun competing in the Skopje League (city league), and then in the regional league of the Skoplje Football Subassociation, a league made of the best clubs coming from the Southern part of the Kingdom of  SCS. The club from its beginning was the place where players from different ethnicities could gather, mostly local Muslim players, but not limited to. There were also numerous Bosnian, Roma and Macedonian players which played in the club.

Sloga's era (1945–1989)

At the end of WWII, the newly established Yugoslav communist regime, against the will of the local citizens and fans, with a decree changed the name of the club to Sloga (which means 'unity' in Macedonian). In that time the club was financed by local citizens and people (fans) gathered money to pay for players and staff salaries. Club in that time played in regional Macedonian Republic League, ranked as a 4th league in the  league system.  The team always had a big army of fans who followed it, no matter if they played home or away.

Sloga Jugomagnat's era (1989–2009)

In 1989, major improvement in all levels occurred with the arrival of Rafet Muminović and his company, “Jugomagnat” as sponsors of the club. At that time Sloga played in the Macedonian Second League (ranked as a 5th league ). That year club changed its name to Sloga Jugomagnat and was promoted to higher level with plan to further promote to the Third Federal League in the following season. However, that year Federation split and Macedonia became an independent country. Sloga Jugomagnat along with 17 other best teams from Macedonia entered  the Macedonian First League, finishing in 6th place in its inaugural season. In second season they achieved 8th place and the following season the club made it to 3rd place.

Champion striker Blagoja Ardjaliev was the top goal scorer in 1996

Later, Sloga achieved few runners up positions and won the championship three times. By 2015, Sloga is still the club holding the record of playing the most Macedonian Cup finals, eight in total, having it won in 3 occasions. By 2015, Sloga is the second most successful club in the country with 3 championships and 3 cup titles with keeping a record win in all time Cup finals, against Pobeda Prilep with result of 6:0. During the 1990s Sloga was very popular in whole country. In 1996, after winning the first cup, more than 1,000 youngsters from Skopje and other cities were registered in the youth school. Many of them later played in different clubs and also in other countries.

In 2005, after financial problems of the main sponsor, the club was relegated to the Second League where stayed four years and in the season 2008–09, with the help of its fans, achieved again promotion to the First League. But next season, Sloga Jugomagnat together with Makedonija Gjorče Petrov started boycotting all competitions organized by the Football Federation of Macedonia as a protest because of the re-election of the president Haralampie Hadži-Risteski. Both teams didn't appear on the matches in the rounds 14 and 15 and according to the regulations by FFM, they have been suspended and expelled from competing in the Macedonian First League. In the beginning, Vardar Skopje, Pelister Bitola, Rabotnički Skopje, Metalurg Skopje, Sileks Kratovo, were also active in this boycott, however later they stopped it, and continued to play except Sloga Jugomagnat and Makedonija Gjorče Petrov.

In 2012, the club was merged with FC Albarsa to form KF Shkupi. However, they are not legally considered to be successors to the original Sloga Jugomagnat and the two clubs' track records and honours are kept separate by the Football Federation of Macedonia.

Honours
 Macedonian First League:
Winners (3): 1998–99, 1999–2000, 2000–01
Runners-up (2): 1995–96, 1997–98

 Macedonian Second League:
Runners-up (1): 2008–09

 Macedonian Football Cup:
Winners (3): 1995–96, 1999–2000, 2003–04
Runners-up (5): 1996–97, 1997–98, 1998–99, 2000–01, 2002–03

Seasons

Sloga in Europe

Historical list of coaches

  Abdül Melik Kurtiş
  Nedžad Verlašević (1994 - 1996)
  Zlatko Krmpotić (1997 - 1998)
  Gjore Jovanovski (1999 - 2001)
  Ekrem Maglajlija (2001)
  Gjore Jovanovski (2001 - 2002)
  Nedžat Šabani (2002)
  Adnan Zekir (2003 - Oct 2004)
  Blagoja Kitanovski (31 Oct 2004 - Apr 2005)
  Husein Beganović (10 Apr 2005 -)
  Šener Bajramović (2005 - 2006)
  Mensur Nedžipi (2008 - Oct 2009)
  Nedžat Šabani (27 Oct 2009 -)

References

External links
 Official Website 
 Supporters Website 
 Football Federation of Macedonia 

 
Defunct football clubs in North Macedonia
Football clubs in Skopje
Association football clubs established in 1927
Association football clubs disestablished in 2009
1927 establishments in Yugoslavia
2009 disestablishments in the Republic of Macedonia